Becki Jayne Harrelson (born 17 August 1954) is a painter located in Atlanta, Georgia, whose artwork combines Orthodox Christian imagery and modern, queer theology.

Biography 
Harrelson began painting in 1993, in response to the Don't ask, don't tell program in the U.S. military, which inspired her to "use [her] art as an activist voice". saying her art explores "contemperary and social justice issues, endeavoring to find Christ's teachings in all of us". Active since 1993, in response to don't ask, don't tell, which inspired her to "use [her] art as an activist voice". Many of her paintings have provoked controversy within the religious community, one of her paintings, The Crucifixion of Christ portraying Jesus Christ on the cross, with the label "faggot" above his head. Harrelson explained this stating, "When you view The Crucifixion of Christ, you miss the primary point if you think I’m saying Jesus was gay...Anytime anyone rises up in condemnation, hatred or violence against another, Christ is crucified". Her work appeared in Art That Dares: Gay Jesus, Woman Christ & More by Kittredge Cherry.

References

External links 
beckijayne.com
jesusiinlove.org

LGBT people from Georgia (U.S. state)
1954 births
American LGBT artists
Queer theologians
Living people
21st-century LGBT people